The Hundred of Darling, is a Hundred in the County of Frome, proclaimed on 29 January 1891 and named after John Darling snr, MP, MLC.
It is located at Latitude: -33.045551300 Longitude: 138.171081542. The topography is mountainous and heavy forested. The main geographic feature is Telowie Gorge.

See also
 Telowie Gorge Conservation Park
 Wirrabara, South Australia

References

Darling